Thomas Herbert Read was an English footballer. His regular position was at full back. He was born in Manchester. He played for Stretford, Manchester City and Manchester United.

References

External links
MUFCInfo.com profile

English footballers
Manchester United F.C. players
Manchester City F.C. players
Year of death missing
Year of birth missing
Association football defenders